Jim Hobbins was a player in the National Football League for the Green Bay Packers in 1987 as a guard. He played at the collegiate level at the University of Minnesota.

Biography
Hobbins was born James Patrick Hobbins on June 4, 1964 in Green Bay, Wisconsin.

See also
Green Bay Packers players

References

1964 births
Green Bay Packers players
Sportspeople from Green Bay, Wisconsin
Players of American football from Wisconsin
Living people
Minnesota Golden Gophers football players